Rage Against the Veil: The Courageous Life and Death of an Islamic Dissident is a book by Parvin Darabi, an Iranian critic of Islam.

The book is about Parvin's sister, Homa Darabi, who on February 21, 1994 committed suicide by immolation in Tajrish Square in Tehran to protest the "slavelike" treatment of women in Iran.  The book details Darabi's life leading up to her death, addressing women's rights in Iran during the monarchy and after the Islamic Revolution.

See also
Human rights in Islamic Republic of Iran
Women in Muslim societies
Statue of a Liberated Woman

Further reading

References

Rage Against the Veil: The Courageous Life and Death of an Islamic Dissident
Rage Against the Veil: The Courageous Life and Death of an Islamic Dissident
Women's rights in Iran
Mahsa Amini protests
Iranian protests against compulsory hijab